Blood Money Part 1 is the sixth studio album by American nu metal band Dope. The album was released on October 28, 2016 by eOne Music, seven years after No Regrets, making it the longest gap between studio albums. The album charted at number 27 on the Billboard 200, Dope's highest-charting position in the US, and stayed on the chart for two weeks. The songs "Selfish", "Blood Money" and "Hold On" were given music videos in respective orders. A prequel album entitled Blood Money Part Zer0 is to be released in 2023.

Reception 
Metal Hammer critic Sophie Maughan gave the record a positive review, writing: "Emotional soliloquies aside, the main allure comes in the form of pounding basslines (Drug Music), twisted beats (X-Hale), and underlying old-school sensibilities with 1999 sure to delight longtime fans and stir up the pits." Grim Lord of New Noise Magazine stated: "After all these years, very little has changed and I'm sure you'll be pleased with the final product."

Track listing

Personnel 
Dope
 Edsel Dope: performance (1, 4, 11), backing vocals (2, 5, 8, 9, 12-15), bass (2, 10, 13), drums (2, 3, 5-10, 12-15), guitars (2, 8, 9, 12-15), vocals (2, 3, 5-10, 12-15), programming (2, 5-10, 12-15)
 Virus: guitars (2, 6, 8, 10, 14, 15), backing vocals (8, 13, 14)
 Nikk Dibs: bass (2, 3, 5-10, 12-15), guitars (3, 5, 6, 8-10, 12, 15), programming (3, 5-10, 12-15), performance (4, 11), backing vocals (5, 8, 9, 15)

Other personnel
 Matt Szlachta: guitars (2, 5-8, 10, 12, 13)
 Jerms Jude: backing vocals (2)
 DJ Nelson: guitars (9, 13, 14), bass (13)
 Peter Szczypinski: backing vocals (15)

References 

2016 albums
Dope (band) albums
MNRK Music Group albums